Vracov is a town in Hodonín District in the South Moravian Region of the Czech Republic. It has about 4,500 inhabitants.

Sights
The main sight is the Church of Saint Lawrence. It was built in the 13th century. A Renaissance tower was added in 1565. The church was baroque rebuilt in the early 18th century.

Notable people
Jan Sládek (1907–1984), gymnast
Josef Somr (1934–2022), actor
Jan Dungel (born 1951), painter, graphic artist and illustrator; grew up here
Tereza Bábíčková (born 2003), racing driver

References

External links

Cities and towns in the Czech Republic
Populated places in Hodonín District
Moravian Slovakia